Herman Nicolas Ventje Sumual (11 June 1923 – 28 March 2010) was a military officer involved in the Indonesian National Revolution. His appointments include regional commander of KODAM VII/Wirabuana, but he is best known as the leader of the Permesta movement.

References
 Matindas, Benny, and Supit, Bert (1998) Ventje Sumual, Pemimpin Yang Menatap Hanya Ke Depan: Biografi Seorang Patriot, Filsuf, Gembong Pemberontak (Ventje Sumual, a Leader that only Looks Forward: A biography of a Patriot, Philosopher, Rebel), Bina Insani, Jakarta

1923 births
2010 deaths
People from Manado
Indonesian Christians
Minahasa people
People from Minahasa Regency
Indonesian military personnel
Indonesian rebels